was a daimyō during mid-Edo period Japan.

Biography
Aoyama Tadashige was the third son of Aoyama Munetoshi, the daimyō of Komoro Domain and was born in Komoro, Shinano Province. On August 5, 1683, he was adopted by his sickly elder brother Aoyama Tadao, at the time daimyō of Hamamatsu Domain (Tōtōmi Province). He became 5th head of the Aoyama clan and daimyō of Hamamatsu on his brother's death in 1685.

On September 7, 1702, Tadashige was transferred to Kameyama Domain in Tanba Province (50,000 koku), where his descendants remained for the next three generations. In September 1714, his courtesy title was changed to Inaba-no-kami. On June 18, 1722, he turned his titles over to his fourth son, Aoyama Toshiharu. He subsequently took the tonsure, and died three months later at age 69.

His grave is at the temple of Tōkai-ji in Shinagawa, Tokyo.

References 
 Papinot, Edmond. (1906) Dictionnaire d'histoire et de géographie du japon. Tokyo: Librarie Sansaisha...Click link for digitized 1906 Nobiliaire du japon (2003)
 The content of much of this article was derived from that of the corresponding article on Japanese Wikipedia.

|-

Fudai daimyo
1654 births
1722 deaths
People from Nagano Prefecture